Time to Burn is the debut studio album by the American hard rock/heavy metal band Taking Dawn.

Track listing

Personnel 
Band members
Chris Babbitt - Vocals, Guitar
Mikey Cross - Guitar, Backing Vocals
Andrew Cushing - Bass, Backing Vocals
Alan Doucette- Drums
Session musicians
Corey Beaulieu (Trivium) - backing vocals

References

Taking Dawn albums
2010 albums